Ariel Rivera is the self-titled debut album by Philippine singer, Ariel Rivera. Released in 1991, it took two years of recording it to finally be finished. It became a massive hit in the Philippines and around Southeast Asia and the Pacific.

Track listing

References 

1991 debut albums
Ariel Rivera albums